Robert Cashin may refer to:

 Robert Cashin (senior) (fl. 1692), Archdeacon of Limerick
 Robert Cashin (junior) (before 1745 – after 1782), Archdeacon of Ardfert